Environmental Toxicology and Chemistry is a monthly peer-reviewed scientific journal covering environmental toxicology and environmental chemistry. It was established in 1982 and is published by Wiley-Blackwell in conjunction with the Society of Environmental Toxicology and Chemistry. The founding editor-in-chief was C.H. Ward (Rice University), and the current one is G.A. Burton, Jr. (University of Michigan). According to the Journal Citation Reports, the journal has a 2020 impact factor of 3.742, ranking it 107th out of 274 journals in the category Environmental sciences and 37th out of 93 in the category Toxicology.

References

External links

Publications established in 1982
Wiley-Blackwell academic journals
Monthly journals
Environmental toxicology
Environmental chemistry
Toxicology journals
Environmental science journals
Chemistry journals
English-language journals